Crusader is Chris de Burgh's fourth album, released by A&M Records in 1979. The album was produced by Andrew Powell, who has worked with the Alan Parsons Project in many of their early albums. The musicians on the album also came from the Alan Parsons Project.

Track listing 

"Carry On" - 3:47
"I Had The Love In My Eyes" - 3:29
"Something Else Again" - 4:25
"The Girl With April In Her Eyes" - 4:55
"Just In Time" - 5:11
"Carry On" (Reprise) - 0:32
"The Devil's Eye" - 4:13
"It's Such A Long Way Home" - 3:31
"Old-Fashioned People" - 3:27
"Quiet Moments" - 1:38
"Crusader" - 8:48
"The Fall Of Jerusalem"
"In The Court Of Saladin"
"The Battlefield"
"Finale"
"You And Me" - 1:12

All songs by Chris de Burgh.

Personnel 

 Chris de Burgh – lead and harmony vocals, six and twelve-string acoustic guitars
 Ian Bairnson – electric guitars, harmony vocals (3)
 David Paton – bass, harmony vocals (3, 8)
 Chris Laurence – double bass (4)
 Skaila Kanga – harp (4)
 Mike Moran – acoustic and electric pianos, organ, synthesizer
 Francis Monkman – harpsichord (4)
 Andrew Powell – acoustic piano (5, 9, 11, 12), orchestra and choir arrangements, conductor
 Stuart Elliott – drums, percussion
 David Cripps – French horn solo (3)
 Olive Simpson – harmony vocals (8)

Production 

 Producer – Andrew Powell
 Engineer – Jon Kelly
 Assistant Engineers – Tim Cuthbertson and Nigel Walker
 Art Direction – Michael Ross
 Design – David Tyrell
 Photography – Rod Shone

1979 albums
Chris de Burgh albums
Albums produced by Andrew Powell
A&M Records albums